"Hard 2 Face Reality" is a song recorded by American record producer Poo Bear, featuring vocals from Canadian singer Justin Bieber and American rapper Jay Electronica. The three artists wrote the song with Dan Kanter and Kenneth Coby, the former of which produced the song with Poo Bear. It was released on April 6, 2018, as the lead single from Poo Bear's debut studio album, Poo Bear Presents Bearthday Music.

Background
The song was written back in late 2013 to early 2014, during the time where Justin Bieber had been accused by the media of several things, run-ins with the law, and his Florida arrest in January 2014. Later that year, Bieber released a demo of the song on SoundCloud on April 27, though it was never released to mainstream music for unknown reasons. At the time, the song only featured Poo Bear on it. The song remained on SoundCloud until November 2017, when it was then removed. On February 4, 2018, Poo Bear told interviewer Ebro Darden during a Beats 1 radio show that he would release the song later in the month.

Credits and personnel
Credits adapted from Tidal.

Performers
 Poo Bear – composition, production
 Justin Bieber – composition
 Jay Electronica – composition

Addition musicians
 Kenneth Coby – composition
 Dan Kanter – composition, production

Studio personnel
 Colin Leonard – master engineering
 Josh Gudwin – mixing

Charts

Release history

References

2018 songs
2018 singles
Justin Bieber songs
Songs written by Poo Bear
Songs written by Justin Bieber
American contemporary R&B songs
American electronic dance music songs
Songs written by Dan Kanter
Songs written by Soundz